A double dissolution is a procedure permitted under the Australian Constitution to resolve deadlocks in the bicameral Parliament of Australia between the House of Representatives (lower house) and the Senate (upper house). A double dissolution is the only circumstance in which the entire Senate can be dissolved.

Similar to the United States Congress, but unlike the British Parliament, Australia's two parliamentary houses generally have almost equal legislative power (the Senate may reject outright but cannot amend appropriation (money) bills, which must originate in the House of Representatives). Governments, which are formed in the House of Representatives, can be frustrated by a Senate determined to reject their legislation.

If the conditions (called a trigger) are satisfied, the prime minister can advise the governor-general to dissolve both houses of Parliament and call a full election. If, after the election, the legislation that triggered the double dissolution is still not passed by the two houses, then a joint sitting of the two houses of parliament can be called to vote on the legislation. If the legislation is passed by the joint sitting, it is deemed to have passed both the House of Representatives and the Senate. The 1974 joint sitting remains the only occurrence in federal Australian history.

Historically, a double dissolution election has been called in lieu of an early election, with the formal trigger bill not playing a significant role during the subsequent election campaign.

There are also similar double dissolution provisions in the South Australian state constitution.

Constitutional basis
Part of section 57 of the Constitution provides:

If the House of Representatives passes any proposed law, and the Senate rejects or fails to pass it, or passes it with amendments to which the House of Representatives will not agree, and if after an interval of three months the House of Representatives, in the same or the next session, again passes the proposed law with or without any amendments which have been made, suggested, or agreed to by the Senate, and the Senate rejects or fails to pass it, or passes it with amendments to which the House of Representatives will not agree, the Governor-General may dissolve the Senate and the House of Representatives simultaneously. But such dissolution shall not take place within six months before the date of the expiry of the House of Representatives by effluxion of time.

Section 57 also provides that, following the election, if the Senate a third time rejects the bill or bills that were the subject of the double dissolution, the Governor-General may convene a joint sitting of the two houses to consider the bill or bills, including any amendments which have been previously proposed in either house, or any new amendments. If a bill is passed by an absolute majority of the total membership of the joint sitting, it is treated as though it had been passed separately by both houses, and is presented for royal assent. The only time this procedure was invoked was in the 1974 joint sitting.

Trigger event
The double dissolution provision comes into play if the Senate and House twice fail to agree on a piece of legislation (in section 57 called "a proposed law", and commonly referred to as a "trigger"). When one or more such triggers exist, the Governor-General may dissolve both the House and Senate – pursuant to section 57 of the Constitution – and issue writs for an election in which every seat in the Parliament is contested.

The conditions stipulated by section 57 of the Constitution are:

 The trigger bill originated in the House of Representatives.
 Three months elapsed between the two rejections of the bill by the Senate ("rejection" in this context can extend to the Senate's failure to pass the bill, or to the Senate passing it with amendments to which the House of Representatives will not agree).
 The second rejection occurred in the same session as the first, or the subsequent session, but no later.

There is no similar provision for resolving deadlocks with respect to bills that have originated in the Senate and are blocked in the House of Representatives.

Though the Constitution refers to possible actions by the Governor-General, it had long been presumed that convention required the Governor-General to act only on the advice of the Prime Minister and the Cabinet. However, as the 1975 constitutional crisis demonstrated, the Governor-General is not compelled to follow the Prime Minister's advice. In these cases, he or she must be personally satisfied that the conditions specified in the Constitution apply, and is entitled to seek additional information or advice before coming to a decision.

Practice and misconceptions
As a High Court Chief Justice Barwick observed in a unanimous decision in Cormack v Cope (Joint Sittings Case) (1974) (with emphasis added):

History 

There have been seven double dissolutions: in 1914, 1951, 1974, 1975, 1983, 1987 and 2016. However, a joint sitting following a double dissolution pursuant to section 57 has only taken place once, in 1974.

 In 1914, the Joseph Cook Commonwealth Liberal Party sought to abolish preferential employment for trade union members in the public service, resulting in a double dissolution on 30 July 1914. In the election on 5 September 1914 the government was defeated by the opposition, Andrew Fisher's Australian Labor Party, and the bill was not pursued.
 In 1951, the Robert Menzies Liberal–Country Party coalition government sought to reverse the proposed nationalisation of the banks put in place by the Australian Labor Party government led by Ben Chifley. The repeal was opposed by the Labor Party in the Senate. Parliament was dissolved on 19 March 1951. In the election on 28 April 1951, the government was returned with a reduced majority in the lower house, but now with a majority in the Senate. The Commonwealth Bank Bill was presented to Parliament again on 26 June 1951 and passed both houses.
 In 1974, the Gough Whitlam Labor government was unable to pass a large number of bills through a hostile Senate. The government had announced a half-Senate election, but in the wake of the Gair affair, Whitlam decided to call a double dissolution on 11 April 1974, citing six bills as triggers.  The bills included representation of the territories and for the setting up of Medibank. At the election of 18 May 1974, the government was returned, but still without a majority in the Senate. Sir Paul Hasluck's term as Governor-General ended on 11 July and the new Governor-General Sir John Kerr took office. The trigger bills were reintroduced and again rejected by the Senate and on 30 July Kerr approved Whitlam's request for a joint sitting. The coalition parties applied to the High Court on 1 August to prevent the joint sitting. One of the grounds was that the dissolution writs did not set out which "proposed laws" were the subject of the dissolution and that only one bill could be dealt with at a joint sitting. The court delivered a unanimous decision on 5 August 1974 and ruled that the sitting was constitutionally valid, that the joint sitting may deal with any number of trigger bills, and that provided the circumstances set out in section 57 had been satisfied then the Governor-General need not specify which "proposed laws" were to be the subject of a future joint sitting. The joint sitting took place on 6–7 August 1974, and it passed the 6 trigger bills. Thirteen months later, four states challenged the validity of various laws passed in the joints sitting. The High Court upheld the validity of the Senate (Representation of Territories) Act 1973, the Commonwealth Electoral Act (No. 2) 1973, and the Representation Act 1973, The Petroleum and Minerals Authority Act 1973, was challenged on the grounds that there had not been the required 3 month gap between the Senate's first and second rejections of that Act. The High Court ruled that the Act was not eligible for the double dissolution process, as the Senate had not had sufficient time to "fail to pass" it.
 In 1975, the Whitlam government was again frustrated by a hostile Senate. The government had accumulated a total of 21 trigger bills, but did not call for a double dissolution. However, the Whitlam government was unable to obtain passage of appropriation bills through the hostile Senate, leading to the 1975 Australian constitutional crisis. On 11 November 1975, in an attempt to break the deadlock, Whitlam intended to call a half-Senate election, but instead was dismissed by the Governor-General, Sir John Kerr, who then appointed Malcolm Fraser, the Leader of the Liberal-Country coalition Opposition, caretaker Prime Minister. The Fraser minority government immediately passed the Supply bills through the Senate before losing a no-confidence motion in the House of Representatives.  Kerr then dissolved both houses of Parliament on the advice of the new Prime Minister citing the trigger bills, even though Fraser had opposed the bills. Fraser remained the caretaker Prime Minister during the election campaign. In the election on 13 December 1975 the Fraser government was elected with a majority in both houses and the trigger bills were not brought up after the election.
 On 3 February 1983, Malcolm Fraser called a double dissolution, citing 13 trigger bills. When Fraser called the election, he expected he would be facing Bill Hayden as the alternative prime minister. But unbeknown to Fraser, Labor had changed leadership from Hayden to Bob Hawke earlier that same morning. The Fraser coalition government was defeated by the Labor Opposition led by Hawke at the election on 5 March 1983, and the bills lapsed. Fraser is the only prime minister to have advised two double dissolutions (1975 and 1983).
 On 5 June 1987, Bob Hawke called a double dissolution after the rejection of the Australia Card Bill 1986. The government was returned at the election of 11 July 1987, but still without a Senate majority. The bill was reintroduced in September 1987, and a vote in the Senate was planned for 7 October. A retired public servant, Ewart Smith, pointed out that the Australia Card Bill was unworkable because the implementation date would have needed to be the subject of a regulation, which would have required the concurrence of the Senate alone, which was hostile to the legislation.  Even if the bill had been passed by the parliament at a joint sitting, the Opposition could still have prevented it from being implemented as long as it held a majority in the Senate.  In these circumstances, Hawke decided to abandon the bill. Sir Ninian Stephen is the only Governor-General to have approved two double dissolutions (1983 and 1987).
 On 8 May 2016, Malcolm Turnbull called a  double dissolution election for 2 July 2016, citing three of the four available trigger bills. The trigger bills were reintroduced to parliament after the election and all were passed with amendments.

Summary 
The following table is a summary of the relevant details:

Elections
A double dissolution affects the outcome of elections for houses of parliament using proportional representation over multiple elections, such as the proportional voting system for the Senate where each state normally only elects half its Senate delegation, but following a double dissolution, each state elects its entire senate delegation.  The outcome is affected in two ways:

 the quota for a seat is lower making it easier for smaller parties to win seats; and
 Senators need to be allocated long-term and short-term seats.

Neither of these issues arise in relation to the two territories represented in the Senate as each elects its two senators to a term ending at the dissolution of the House of Representatives.

Quota 
Under proportional representation, the more seats there are, the easier it is for smaller parties to win seat. A double dissolution increases the number of available seats because all seats are contested in the same election. The following calculations refer to the current arrangements of 12 senate seats per state since 1984, however the calculations are similar for the period from 1949 until 1983 when there were 10 senate seats per state. The quota for the election of each senator in each Australian state in a full senate election is 7.69%, while in a normal half-Senate election the quota is 14.28%.

While the threshold is lower for smaller parties, for more significant parties the distribution of candidates' votes as they are eliminated has a rounding effect. A double dissolution favours parties that have a vote significantly greater than a multiple of the required double dissolution vote and greater than a multiple of the normal quota. It disadvantages those that do not. For example, a party achieving 10% of the vote is likely to get one candidate out of six elected in a regular election (as minor parties' votes are distributed until they get to 14.28%) but the same party with the same vote is likely to have one candidate out of 12 elected during a double dissolution election (as their second candidate will be left with 2.31% and be excluded early in the count). A party with 25% is likely to achieve three candidates out of 12 during a double dissolution election (three candidates and 1.83% of the vote for their 4th candidate distributed to other candidates) and two out of six in a regular election (one candidate taking 14.28% and the second holding 10.72% remains standing until minor parties' preferences push the second candidate to a quota).

Since the abolition of group voting tickets in the lead-up to the 2016 general election, it is no longer possible to create "calculators" that assess the senate election outcome with reasonable accuracy. Antony Green's working guide is that "if a party has more than 0.5 of a quota, it will be in the race for one of the final seats". His calculation of the percentage of primary-vote required for the first six full- and half-quotas at a double dissolution election are as follows:

Unlike the case of a normal half-Senate election, the newly elected Senate, like the House, takes office immediately. The Senate cycle is altered, with the next change of Senate membership scheduled for the third date that falls on 1 July after the election. The senators from each state are divided into two classes: the first class receive three-year terms and the second class receive six-year terms (both of these may be interrupted by another double dissolution). Thus for the Parliament elected in the March 1983 double dissolution election, the next two Senate changeovers would have been due on 1 July 1985 and 1 July 1988, while the term of the new House of Representatives would have expired in 1986. Bob Hawke decided to call a regular federal election for December 1984 after only 18 months in office, to bring the two election cycles back into synchronisation.

Allocation of long-term and short-term seats 

In order to return to the normal arrangement of half the state Senators being contested at each election, following a double dissolution, section 13 of the Australian Constitution requires the senate to divide the state senators into two classes, with three-year and six-year terms. This has traditionally been done by allocating long terms to the senators elected earliest in the count. The 1984 amendments to the Commonwealth Electoral Act required the Australian Electoral Commission to conduct a notional recount as if only half the seats were to be elected, which was seen as producing a fairer allocation. This alternative allocation has not yet been used. Following double dissolution elections in 1987 and 2016, the order-elected method continued to be used, despite Senate resolutions in 1998 and 2010 agreeing to use the new method.

South Australian double dissolutions 
Under section 41 of the South Australian constitution, if a bill is passed by the House of Assembly during a session of Parliament and in the following Parliament after a general election for the lower house is rejected by the Legislative Council on both occasions, it is permitted for the Governor of South Australia to either issue a writ for the election of 2 additional members of the Legislative Council or to dissolve both houses at the same time to elect an entirely new Parliament. As the upper house consists of 22 members, with 11 elected statewide at each general election for an 8-year term at a quota of 8.33%, this would result in an election for all 22 members at a quota of 4.35%.

Although it has been threatened, this South Australian double dissolution procedure has never been used.

See also 

 Electoral system of Australia

Explanatory notes

References 

Australian Senate
Federal elections in Australia
Parliament of Australia
Political terminology in Australia